This list is of the Cultural Properties of Japan designated in the categories of  and  for the Prefecture of Okinawa.

National Cultural Properties

Classical texts
As of 1 August 2020, two Important Cultural Properties have been designated, being of national significance.

Ancient documents
As of 1 August 2020, two Important Cultural Properties have been designated.

Prefectural Cultural Properties

Calligraphic works
As of 1 May 2019, four properties have been designated at a prefectural level.

Classical texts
As of 1 May 2019, four properties have been designated at a prefectural level.

Ancient documents
As of 1 May 2019, seven properties have been designated at a prefectural level.

Municipal Cultural Properties

Calligraphic works
As of 1 May 2019, six properties have been designated at a municipal level.

Classical texts
As of 1 May 2019, ten properties have been designated at a municipal level.

Ancient documents
As of 1 May 2019, fifty properties have been designated at a municipal level.

See also
 Cultural Properties of Japan
 List of National Treasures of Japan (writings: Chinese books)
 List of National Treasures of Japan (writings: Japanese books)
 List of National Treasures of Japan (writings: others)
 List of National Treasures of Japan (ancient documents)
 Rekidai Hōan
 List of Cultural Properties of Japan - historical materials (Okinawa)
 Writing in the Ryukyu Kingdom

References

External links
  Cultural Properties in Okinawa Prefecture
  List of Cultural Properties in Okinawa Prefecture
  Digital archive of the University of the Ryukyus Library

Cultural Properties,Writings
Writings,Okinawa